Dig & Dug with Daisy is a British stop motion animated television series that was produced in the United Kingdom during 1993 by Dorling Kindersley (publishers of the Eyewitness Books Series). There are sixteen ten minute episodes, and the characters were created and the stories written by writer Richard Everett. The series was aired by Channel 4 in 1994. It aired on children's channels like Channel 5 from 2002 to 2004 and Tiny Pop from 2009 to 2011.

The series is about two bumbling construction workers, Dig and Dug, who are given a task to accomplish over a five-minute short. Aside from using segments much like Laurel and Hardy shorts, the show also teaches children about construction. The show was narrated by George Layton. The animated series was created, produced and directed by Terry Ward M D at Flicks Films Ltd, Wardour Street, London.

Major characters 
 Dig: Dig is Dug's fellow companion, young, tall and skinny in appearance. Despite being eager, hard working, and ready for the job, he is quite naïve, can be easily frightened, and is inexperienced. This can often lead to comical predicaments! However, little by little, Dig is starting to learn a little bit more about machinery and construction. He is presumably in his early 30s.
 Dug: Dug is Dig's co worker. He is stumpy, a little bit older than Dig, a bit more experienced with machinery, but just as bumbling and naïve. Dug often controls,or tries to control, the assignments given to him and Dig, but his clumsiness often gets the two of them into trouble. He can even make little, fixable problems become huge and serious. He is most likely just about in his 40s.
 Daisy: Daisy is Dug's long suffering niece. She is smarter than the two construction workers put together, so this allows her and her aunt Beth to solve almost any problem that Dig and Dug cannot solve at all. Neither her mother nor father have ever appeared on the show for unknown reasons, but it is safe to assume that her Uncle Dug would be the brother of either one of Daisy's parents.
 Farmer Stubble: Farmer Stubble lives at Merryweather Farm. He appeares as a main character in the first four episodes, 'The New Tractor', 'Turnips in the Lane', 'Fencing the Field' and 'Trouble at the Haybarn.' His first name is revealed to be Ernest and his wife's name is Mildred. Mrs. Stubble also appeares in 'The New Tractor' and 'Trouble at the Haybarn', but in 'Turnips in the Lane' and 'Fencing the Field', Farmer Stubble appeares without her. As his name suggests, he has a stubble on his chin.
However, the two of them appeares in 'Night Patrol' and Ernest also appeares in 'The New Office'. They even appear in flashbacks from the first two episodes seen in 'The 100th Tractor' when Dug was telling the mayoress about several adventures that he and Dig had been on earlier while taking her to the tractor factory.
 Mr. Rubble: Dig and Dug's building site boss. It is unknown what accent he talks in, although his voice does have a loud booming tone. The only four episodes he appeares in are 'Mrs. Sparkle's Shed', 'Cement Pudding', 'Mr. Rubble's Wall' and 'Daisy's Kite'.
 Mr. MacAdam: Mr. MacAdam is Dig and Dug's boss of the Roadworks site. He is very good with machinery and construction, but a closer look reveals that Mr. MacAdam is almost just as clumsy and bumbling as Dig and Dug himself. He talks in a Scottish accent. The only four episodes he appeares in are 'Night Patrol', 'Nowhere to Park', 'The Giant Molehill' and 'Race to the Finish'.
 Mr. Packet: Mr. Packet is Dig and Dug's manager of the tractor factory and talks in a Welsh accent. He can discover voices inside the factory. He can also deal with things such as Oswald behaving badly, his new office arriving late, making him feel upset and worried, and solve Oswald's problem by 'saying he has run out of paint' on the day of 'The 100th Tractor'. The only four episodes he appeares in are 'All Hooked Up', 'Oswald Misbehaves', 'The New Office' and 'The 100th Tractor'.

Episodes 
 1. The New Tractor
 2. Turnips in the Lane
 3. Fencing the Field
 4. Trouble at the Haybarn
 5. Mrs. Sparkle's Shed
 6. Cement Pudding
 7. Mr. Rubble's Wall
 8. Daisy's Kite
 9. Night Patrol
 10. Nowhere to Park
 11. The Giant Molehill
 12. Race to the Finish
 13. All Hooked Up
 14. Oswald Misbehaves
 15. The New Office
 16. The 100th Tractor

Australian VHS releases
 Roadshow Entertainment (1995)

References
 http://www.richardeverett.co.uk – The official website of writer Richard Everett

1994 British television series debuts
1994 British television series endings
1990s British children's television series
Channel 4 original programming
1990s British animated television series
English-language television shows
Fictional trios
British children's animated adventure television series
British stop-motion animated television series